The men's 100 metres sprint event at the 1932 Summer Olympics in Los Angeles, California, United States, were held at the Los Angeles Memorial Coliseum on July 31 and August 1. Thirty-three runners from 17 nations competed. The 1930 Olympic Congress in Berlin had reduced the limit from 4 athletes per NOC to 3 athletes.

The photo finish final was won by American Eddie Tolan in a world record-equalling time of 10.38 seconds. Teammate Ralph Metcalfe won the silver and was credited with the same time as Tolan. It was the first American victory since 1920, after the United States was kept off the podium entirely in 1928. Germany won its second consecutive bronze medal in the event. Defending Olympic champion and world record holder Percy Williams of Canada did not advance past the semifinals. Takayoshi Yoshioka was the first Asian to make the final.

Background

This was the ninth time the event was held, having appeared at every Olympics since the first in 1896. Notable entrants included Canada's Percy Williams, the defending gold medalist and world record holder, and American Ralph Metcalfe, NCAA champion and U.S. Olympic trial winner.

Two electrical timing devices, one hand-operated and one camera-based, were introduced to "double check" the stop watches.

China was represented in the event for the first time. The United States was the only nation to have appeared at each of the first nine Olympic men's 100 metres events.

Competition format

The event retained the four round format from 1920–1928: heats, quarterfinals, semifinals, and a final. There were 7 heats, of 4–6 athletes each, with the top 3 in each heat advancing to the quarterfinals. The 21 quarterfinalists (19 after two withdrawals) were placed into 4 heats of 4 or 5 athletes. Again, the top 3 advanced. There were 2 heats of 6 semifinalists, once again with the top 3 advancing to the 6-man final.

Records
These are the standing world and Olympic records (in seconds) prior to the 1932 Summer Olympics.

Arthur Jonath equalled the standing Olympic record with 10.6 in the third heat of the first round. Eddie Tolan set a new Olympic record with 10.4 in the first heat of the quarterfinals, and in the final, Tolan and Ralph Metcalfe equalled the world record of 10.3.

Results

Heats

Heat 1

Heat 2

Heat 3

Heat 4

Heat 5

Heat 6

Heat 7

Quarterfinals

Berra and Lambrou withdrew before the quarterfinals.

Quarterfinal 1

Quarterfinal 2

Quarterfinal 3

Quarterfinal 4

Semifinals

Semifinal 1

The finish was so close that the timing system displayed errors.

Film of the race indicates that Yoshioka won with Joubert second and Tolan third, while officials clocked Tolan at 10.81 seconds, with Joubert also at 10.81 seconds, and Yoshioka at 10.83 seconds. 

However, this discrepancy was a moot point, as all three men advanced to the final in any event.

Semifinal 2

Final

Under the rules in force at the time, runners were judged to have finished the race when they had crossed the line; in 1933, this was changed so that runners finished the race when they reached the line.

The final was close enough that had this rule been in force at the Games, Metcalfe would have been the winner: Melcalfe reached the finish line first, but Tolan, who was shorter, crossed the line first.

References

External links
, from http://www.omegawatches.com/; retrieved 2012-10-01.

Athletics at the 1932 Summer Olympics
100 metres at the Olympics
Men's events at the 1932 Summer Olympics